Events in the year 2022 in Hungary.

Incumbents
President: Katalin Novák
Prime Minister: Viktor Orbán
Speaker of the National Assembly: László Kövér

Events

February 

 16 February – The European Court of Justice dismisses Poland and Hungary's challenges against the regulation and confirms that the regulation is in compliance with the treaties of the European Union. This will allow the European Commission to suspend funds from the EU budget to member states that have rule of law issues which are likely to affect the management of EU funds.

March
 7 March – Hungarian Prime Minister Viktor Orbán signs a decree allowing the deployment of NATO troops in western Hungary, and the transfer of lethal weapons across its territory to other NATO member states. However, the decree does not allow weapons shipments across its territory to Ukraine.
 10 March – 2022 Hungarian presidential election: The governing alliance, Fidesz-KDNP nominated presidential candidate Katalin Novák, the former minister for Family Affairs is elected, becoming the first-ever female president.
 16 March –: 2022 Hungarian teacher's strike
 30 March – It is reported that Russian government hackers have attacked and compromised the servers of Hungary's Ministry of Foreign Affairs since late 2021.

April
 3 April – Viktor Orbán's Fidesz–KDNP alliance, Wins the Hungarian 2022 elections in a 4 election in a  row Landslide preserving its two-thirds majority which it has held since 2010. The opposition alliance United for Hungary makes loses, while The Far Right Nationalist Mi Hazánk party won seats for the first time.
 5 April – 
 Five people are killed and ten others are injured when a train collides with a pickup truck in Mindszent.
 The European Commission launches disciplinary proceedings against Hungary under the newly-upheld conditionality mechanism that could block funds over rule-of-law concerns if the shortcomings do not prevent misuse of EU funds.

May
      
 1 May – Hungary, a member of the European Union, says that it will veto any sanctions that would restrict energy imports from Russia. Unanimity among the 27 EU members is required to introduce sanctions.
 2 May – Ukraine's National Security and Defense Council Secretary Oleksiy Danilov accuses Hungary of having advance knowledge of the Russian invasion, saying that Hungary was warned by Russian President Vladimir Putin, and that Hungary had plans to annex parts of Western Ukraine.
 10 May – Katalin Novák takes office as the first female President of Hungary. 
 19–20 May – A conservative conference billed by the organizers as CPAC Hungary was held in Budapest, Hungary. Speakers included Hungary's Prime Minister Viktor Orbán, Spain's Vox party leader Santiago Abascal, Eduardo Bolsonaro, right-wing US commentator Candace Owens, Ernst Roets the Deputy CEO of AfriForum, and former US White House chief of staff Mark Meadows, as well as far-right US conspiracy theorist Jack Posobiec and Hungarian journalist Zsolt Bayer. According to The Guardian, Bayer has previously "called Jews 'stinking excrement', referred to Roma as 'animals' and used racial epithets to describe Black people".
 24 May – Hungary declares a state of emergency over the war in Ukraine and problems in the Hungarian economy caused in part by the conflict.

June 

 27 June – Four people are injured when an apartment roof collapses in Budapest.

July
 23 July – Prime Minister Viktor Orbán in a speech in Romania, speaks against the “mixing” of European and non-European races, adding “We [Hungarians] are not a mixed race and we do not want to become a mixed race,”.

September
5 September – A vehicle and train collision in Kunfehértó, Hungary, kills seven people and injures the train's driver. 
15 September – Hungary pass new abortion restrictions, with a Mandatory ultrasounds bill. Where women who are seeking an abortion will now be obliged to “listen to the foetal heartbeat” before they can have an abortion. This Bill was pushed for by the far-right Mi Hazank (Our Homeland) party.

October 

 23 October – Thousands of people, including teachers and students, protest across Hungary against the government of Viktor Orbán, demanding higher salaries and the right to strike amid a high level of inflation in the country.

Deaths

January

 1 January – Gergely Homonnay, 46, Hungarian writer, journalist and LGBTQ activist.
 4 January – Irma Mico, 107, Austro-Hungarian-born French resistance fighter.

February

 2 February – Irén Pavlics, 87, Hungarian-Slovenian writer.
 4 February – Tibor Bodnár, 66, Hungarian Olympic sports shooter (1976, 1980).
 12 February –
 Alexander Brody, 89, Hungarian-American businessman, author, and marketing executive.
 Szabolcs Pásztor, 62, Olympic fencer.
17 February – Máté Fenyvesi, 88, footballer.
19 Febriary – Gábor Vida, 92, Olympic figure skater.

March 

 4 March – Paula Marosi, 85, Olympic frencer.
 6 March – Margit Korondi, 89, Gymnast. 
 7 March – István T. Horváth, 68, Hungarian American chemist.
 31 March – Zoltán Friedmanszky, 87, football player.

April 

 6 April – Karol Divín, 86, Hungarian-born Slovak figure skater.
 8 April – József Salim, 54, Olympic taekwondo practitioner.
 11 April – Gábor Görgey, 92, writer and poet, minister of culture.
 21 April – Iván Markó, 75, dancer and choreographer.

May 

 4 May – Géza Varasdi, 94, athlete, Olympic bronze medallist.
 7 May – Maria Radnoti-Alföldi, 95, Hungarian-German archaeologist and numismatist.
 16 May – Albin Molnár, 86, Olympic sailor.
 22 May – József Duró, 55, football player.
 25 May – Lívia Gyarmathy, 90, film director and screenwriter.
 28 May – Péter Haumann, 81, actor.

June 

 1 June – István Szőke, 75, footballer.
 4 June – György Moldova, 88, writer.
 10 June – Zoltán Dörnyei, 62, Hungarian-born British linguist.
 12 June – Robert O. Fisch, 97, Hungarian-born American pediatrician, artist, and author.
 29 June – Miklós Szabó, 93, Olympic long-distance runner.

July 

 7 July – János Berecz, 91, politician, MP.
 9 July – András Törőcsik, 67, footballer
 20 July – Jolán Kleiber-Kontsek, 82, discus thrower
 22 July – Stefan Soltész, 73, Hungarian-Austrian conductor
 25 July – John Bienenstock, 85, Hungarian-born Canadian physician
 28 July – 
 József Kardos, 62,  footballer
 Péter Szőke, 74,  tennis player

August 

 9 August – Zoltán Halász, 62, Olympic cyclist
 11 August – József Tóth, 70, footballer
 15 August – András Várhelyi, 68, journalist and politician
 18 August – István Liptay, 87, Olympic basketball player
 22 August – György Pásztor, 99, Hall of Fame ice hockey player
 27 August – Ferenc Stámusz, 88, Olympic racing cyclist

September 

 1 September – István Szalay, 78, mathematician and politician, MP 
 7 September – János Fuzik, 64, journalist and politician
 14 September – 
 Géza Csapó, 71, canoeist.
 Mária Wittner, 85, revolutionary and politician, MP
 15 September – Tibor Frank, 74, historian.
 17 September – Anna Thynn, Marchioness of Bath, 78, Hungarian-born British actress.
 21 September – Andrea Molnár-Bodó, 88, gymnast
 22 September – István Aranyos, 80, Olympic gymnast
 23 September – Imre Koltai, 84, chemical engineer and politician, MP
 27 September – Judah Samet, 84, Hungarian-American Holocaust survivor
 29 September – Ildikó Szendrődi-Kővári, 92, Olympic alpine skier
 30 September – József Horváth, 75, Olympic handball player

October 

 2 October – Béla Szakcsi Lakatos, 79, pianist and composer
 26 October – Imre Forgács, 73, jurist, minister of justice
 30 October – Miklós Lukáts, 76, politician, MP

November 

 7 November – Éva Szabó, 77, tennis player
 14 November – Pál Révész, 88, mathematician
 21 November – Kálmán Mészöly, 81, football player
 25 November – Erzsébet Vasvári-Pongrátz, 68, Olympic sports shooter
 27 November – Gábor Csapó, 72, water polo player

December 

 7 December – Ákos Kertész, 90,  writer and screenwriter
 9 December – Mihály Huszka, 89, Olympic weightlifter
 10 December – Gabor Kalman, 92, Hungarian-American physicist
 12 December – Iván Faragó, 76,  chess grandmaster
 14 December – Roch Kereszty, 89, Hungarian-American monk and scholar
 21 December –
 Lajos Koutny, 83, Olympic ice hockey player
 György Tumpek, 93, swimmer, Olympic bronze medallist 
 23 December – József Fitos, 63, football player
 27 December –
 Imre Szöllősi, 81, sprint canoeist
 Tibor Viniczai, 66, agricultural engineer and politician
 29 December – János Varga, 83, wrestler

See also
List of Hungarian films since 1990

References

 
2020s in Hungary
Years of the 21st century in Hungary
Hungary
Hungary